The Hotsuma Tsutae (also Hotuma Tsutaye, Japanese 秀真伝) is an elaborate epic poem of Japanese legendary history which differs substantially from the mainstream version as recorded in the Kojiki and the Nihon Shoki. Its antiquity is undetermined.

Although many proponents allege that the Hotsuma predates the mainstream mythology, the first known manuscript was dedicated to a shrine by Waniko Yasutoshi (also known as Yunoshin Ibo) in 1775. Some excerpts were published and translated into modern Japanese in 1884, a printing which was noted by Hirata Atsutane in his work on jindai moji, a Japanese writing system developed prior to the use of Chinese characters, but which otherwise ignored the work. Atsutane's Kokugaku was principally concerned with the Kojiki and the Hotsuma Tsutae would have only muddled his theories. Yasutoshi's manuscript was almost lost, but was discovered and rescued in 1993 following the publication of some popular books on the subject in the mid-20th century by Yoshinosuke Matsumoto.

The Hotsuma Tsutae is known for its text and rhythm. It was written in yamato-kotoba, which only uses a Japanese vocabulary which predates contact with China. Some of the yamato-kotoba used in Hotsuma Tsutae are unattested elsewhere in the Old Japanese corpus but have parallels to old words. Meaning that if it is a late medieval hoax, it is extremely elaborate. Among other things in its primarily historical and non-mythological record, the text discusses the births, lives, and deaths of kami from Japanese folk shrines and history; in this case, the word kami being used to mean something like royalty and not "gods". In the poem, Amaterasu, the sun kami of Shinto, is male, and not female as is written in the official records. Matsumoto theorizes that Amaterasu was feminized in the Kojiki and Nihon Shoki to provide a justification for the reign of Empress Suiko who reigned just before those documents were written.

Although for the most part Japanese academics remain uninterested in this text, some scholars are of the opinion that it may have been written in the Edo period. This is due to claims that the text was written in an original Japanese alphabet - in academic circles, the existence of writing in Japan before the use of Chinese characters is denied, also the alphabet does not reflect the Old Japanese phonology but rather those of later stages of Japanese. The general opinion is that it is a false document. However, no definitive conclusion has yet been reached.

References

External links
 Modern English translations of the Hotsuma Tsutae
 tokyo woshite kenkyukai in facebook
 The Hotsuma Legends: Paths of the Ancestors

1775 poems
18th-century manuscripts
Japanese mythology
Edo-period works
Hoaxes in Japan
Literary forgeries
Forged epic poems
Jindai moji
Japanese false documents